was a Japanese company that served as a music publisher label for Japanese musicians, anime soundtracks and video game soundtracks. It was established on November 26, 1999, and became a subsidiary of Bandai Visual in May 2006, itself a subsidiary of Bandai Namco Holdings. In February 2018, it was announced Lantis would be merged with Bandai Visual into a new company called Bandai Namco Arts. The reorganizing took effect on April 1, 2018. Lantis only remains as a label from the new company.

Lantis merger with Bandai Visual 

In February 2018, it was announced Bandai Visual would be merged with Lantis into a new branch of BNH, called Bandai Namco Arts.

The reorganizing took effect as of April 1, 2018. Bandai Visual remains only as a label of the new company.

Sublabels 
Lantis is composed of four labels:
 Lantis (main label, formerly distributed by King Records, currently self-distributed)
 Glory Heaven (distributed by Sony Music Entertainment Japan)
 Kiramune (self-distributed)
 Mellow Head (distributed by NBCUniversal Entertainment Japan, defunct)

Artists

Notes

References

External links 
 Lantis.jp, official website 
 

 
Anime industry
Bandai Visual
Japanese companies established in 1999
Japanese companies disestablished in 2018
Record labels established in 1999
Record labels disestablished in 2018
Japanese record labels